Micah P. Hinson and the Gospel of Progress is an album by Micah P. Hinson, released in 2004.  It includes the single Beneath the Rose, which peaked at 111 on the Music Week charts in the UK.  The album itself was number 5 on Rough Trade Shop's 100 Best Albums of 2004.

Track listing
 Close Your Eyes
 Beneath The Rose
 Don't You (Part 1 & 2)
 The Possibilities
 As You Can See
 At Last, Our Promises
 I Still Remember
 The Nothing
 Stand In My Way
 Patience
 You Lost Sight On Me
 Caught In Between
 The Day Texas Sank To The Bottom Of The Sea

Personnel 
 Micah P. Hinson - vocals, guitars, piano, snare drum, floor tom, arrangement, production, photography
Christian Madden - piano, Hammond M102 organ, accordion, melodica, KORG M510, Hohner pianet, wah wah Fender Rhodes, Mellotron strings, Mellotron flute, arrangement, production
Nicky Madden - alto saxophone, tenor saxophone, baritone saxophone, flute, recorder, backing vocals
Gareth Maybury - tuba, euphonium, trombone, trumpet
Sara Lowes - vocals, backing vocals
Richard Young - drums, percussion
Tom Knott - trumpet, backing vocals, recording, mixing, production
Semay Wu - cello
H. da Massa - harmonica
Alex Berry - upright bass
Sue Garnett - backing vocals
G. T. Hatton - production
J. M. Lapham - production
Noel Summerville - mastering
Madamoiselle Antoinette - modeling

References

Micah P. Hinson albums
2004 albums